Siahkal (also Romanized as Sīāhkal, Seyāh Kal, Sīāh Kal, and Sīyāh Kal; also known as Sīāhkal Maḩalleh) is a city and capital of Siahkal County, Gilan Province, Iran.  At the 2006 census, its population was 15,274, in 4,343 families.

Siahkal was the scene of the 1971 Siahkal uprising.

References

Populated places in Siahkal County

Cities in Gilan Province